The 2022–23 Albanian Women's National Championship is the 14th season of the Albanian Women's National Championship, the top Albanian women's league for association football clubs, since its establishment in 2009. The season started on 24 September 2022 and will end on 7 May 2023.

League table

Results

Top scorers

References

External links
Official website

2022–23
2022–23 domestic women's association football leagues
Women's National Championship